The Exhibition of Industrial Arts and Manufacturers was held in 1849 in Birmingham between 3 September until 15 December 1849. It was held in a temporary two storey building in the grounds of the former Bingley House.

Visitors 
There were 100 000 visitors, including Charles Darwin and Robert Stephenson. Prince Albert, who was already planning an 1851 exhibition with Henry Cole, visited on 1 November, and got the model for the Great Exhibition in 1851.

Displays 
There were 131 displays in the main hall.
There was a 2 tier, 20 feet high candelabrum from Osler.
Hardman & Co., in collaboration with Augustus Pugin displayed church furniture and stained glass.
Chance Brothers showed three large painted windows, intended eventually for the church at Warstone Lane Cemetery.
Cadbury Brothers showed cocoa, chicory, homeopathic cocoa, chocolate including 
vanilla eating chocolate.

References 

1849 in England
Events in Birmingham, West Midlands
World's fairs in England